Seven in Darkness is an American made-for-TV adventure film directed by Michael Caffey and based on the novel Against Heaven's Hand by Leonard Bishop. The premiere entry in the 1969–76 series ABC Movie of the Week, it was broadcast on September 23, 1969.

The film is affectionately recalled by Ethan Coen in "The Old Country", story 2 in his 1998 collection "Gates of Eden".

Plot 
The film follows a group of blind people who are flying to a convention for the blind in Seattle. The group consists of its charismatic leader, Alex Swain, a former doctor-turned-teacher for the blind. With him are his old friends Emily Garth, recently blinded Larry Wise, Ramon and Christine Rohas, who are expecting their first child at any moment, and singer Deborah Cabot, who is traveling with her sighted father. Also along are Vietnam War hero Mark Larsen, who is harboring a guilty secret, and Sam Fuller (Milton Berle in a rare dramatic role), a bitter and selfish man who antagonizes everyone in the group.

Due to bad weather, the plane is hundreds of miles off course, and crashes in a forest. The four sighted people (three crew members and Harlan Cabot, Deborah Cabot's father) are killed, while the eight blind passengers survive. There is a blizzard approaching and the wreckage of the plane is teetering precariously on the side of the mountain. The only hope for survival is to climb down the mountain and seek help. The survivors turn to Mark to lead them out of the wilderness - a fact which Alex resents bitterly, and leads to further troubles. Sam wants to strike out on his own. Deborah is in shock over the death of her father. Emily has an injured ankle, and Christine may give birth at any moment. In addition to the weather and rough terrain, the survivors struggle to evade a pack of hungry wolves.

The group discovers an old railway line and attempts to follow it, but when they come to a river the crossing ends half-way and Larry is killed in a fall. Christine gives birth to her baby, and Alex is attacked by a wolf. They know they must get away before the pack, having tasted blood, comes back, but there appears to be no way to get across the river. They eventually discover a rotting, wooden suspension footbridge over their heads - their only chance. On the other side they continue to follow the railroad tracks until they run into a little boy and his dog. The boy is frightened by the appearance of the strangers and wants only to get away, but Mark holds onto the dog, forcing the boy to go for his father. The man spots the survivors and goes to help them as the film ends.

Cast

Milton Berle as Sam Fuller
Sean Garrison as Mark Larsen
Dina Merrill as Emily Garth
Barry Nelson as Alex Swain
Arthur O'Connell as Larry Wise
Alejandro Rey as Ramon Rohas
Elizabeth Walker as Christine Rohas
Lesley Ann Warren as Deborah Cabot

Michael Fox as the Pilot
James J. Griffith as Harlan Cabot
Nancy Fisher as the Stewardess
Mike Masters as the Father
Ted Foulkes as the Boy
Bill Dyer as the Co-Pilot

Additional credits
Song "And They Danced" by Nino Candido
Technical assistance provided by The Braille Institute of America, Inc.

See also
List of American films of 1969

References

External links

1969 television films
1969 films
1960s adventure drama films
ABC Movie of the Week
Films about blind people
Films about aviation accidents or incidents
Films based on American novels
1969 drama films